eMedia Productions (Branded as eMedia Mo!; !) is a radio and television production company based in Zamboanga City serving its base city as well as the province of Basilan and Zamboanga Sibugay.

eMedia Productions currently operates as a content provider of the Westwind Broadcasting Network.

History 
The establishment of this network was unplanned. It was early morning of September 9, 2013, when the Zamboanga Siege erupted at Lustre St., Sta. Catalina, Zamboanga City. The ground zero of the siege was few blocks away from the Radio Mindanao Network (RMN) studios at ZAMEVECO Building, Pilar St., Zamboanga City. It disrupts the regular programming of their radio station both RMN's DXRZ 900 AM and I FM 96.3 and took the coverage in order to give updates to the Zamboangenos.

Days has gone and the demand for the coverage arises. The company then decides to provide live stream via public television. With all collective photos, live scenes and footages they have during the siege, it then formed the establishment of RMN TV Zamboanga via UStream, and later through public television on channel 37, headed by their broadcasters, Bong Simbajon, Gil Climaco, Jimmy Villaflores, and Weng Dela Pena. The television broadcasting services was then provided by eMedia Productions, a division of Alberei Advertising Corporation. While the studios were provided by RMN Zamboanga.

Alberei Advertising Corporation is an advertising company based in Zamboanga City with divisions that has expertise in marketing and advertising. They own several billboards for rent and provides advertising services for the city.

On September 20, 2013, RMN Zamboanga announces their availability on TV through channel 57, and on Cable TV via Mindanao Cable Television, 
on channel 98.

At the middle of their test broadcast, DXRZ 900 AM gained a lot of popularity that the people wanted them to be heard over the FM Radio. By that time, only a few uses AM radio and most of their listeners can only hear them thru mobile with the FM band application. Though I FM 96.3 provided the FM broadcast, the company decided to formalize RMN FM Zamboanga on 105.9Mhz in order for I FM 96.3 to return on its regular programming, while RMN FM Zamboanga will serve as the relay FM Station for RMN's DXRZ 900AM following their live coverage of the Zamboanga Siege.

The siege ended in October 2013, yet another event struck the city with worst flash flood of its history. Likewise, RMN's DXRZ 900 AM with the relay on RMN TV Zamboanga, RMN FM Zamboanga took the coverage of the said incident. Their live broadcast both on TV and radio of these two events made them more popular to Zamboangenos.

The series of events popularizes their first slogan, Grabe Man! Dwele Sa'yo?, a spoof slogan at the midst on the popularity of "Chagalog", a mix of Tagalog words such as Grabe Man and Chavacano words such as Dwele Sa'yo. The slogan was accidentally popularized by Gil Climaco when he always reacted with the words "Grabe Man" during their daily programming.

After such series of events and the city normalizes, they started variety of programming such as religious programs from Victory Church Zamboanga. Soon after, a relay programming from Radio Mindanao Network of Cebu City was made upon their broadcasting agreement with their parent company. RMN's popularity on TV and radio made their local competitor GBPI TV 11 and their subsidiary Magic 95.5 to debut a similar programming named "Dateline Teleradyo" as their counterpart.

However, months after their success, the men behind RMN TV Zamboanga gone in separate ways and ended up with misunderstanding. Weng Dela Pena moved to Brigada News FM as one of their major anchorman in Brigada News Manila, before moving to Radyo Pilipinas 1 738 kHz, and eventually Super Radyo DZBB 594 kHz. While Jimmy Villaflores being the barangay chairman of Sta. Catalina took immediate response for his constituents which was devastated by the Zamboanga Siege. The TV Network then decided to split from Radio Mindanao Network and establish their own. eMedia Productions of Alberei Advertising Corporation set their own TV Network and formed with the same branding "eMedia Productions". With Alberei's eMedia were Bong Simbajon, Gil Climaco while Jimmy Villaflores, who later became as the city councilor of Zamboanga City, helped them in formation of the company. They move to their own studios at RBB Building, Villa Theresa Subdivision, Maria Clara L. Lobregat Highway, Zamboanga City. Simbajon, Climaco, and Villaflores became the head anchors of their news program with the debut of "Ronda De Noche" (Chavacano: Nightly Patrol) and "Report Del Pueblo" (Chavacano: Report of the City).

With their separation of RMN is the separation of their radio station, RMN FM Zamboanga. It was rebranded as eMedia 105.9 News FM. The radio station plays as a relay of the television broadcast.

Areas of coverage 
This is their area of coverage as of 2018:
 Zamboanga City
 Zamboanga Sibugay
 Isabela, Basilan
 Lamitan, Basilan

Means of broadcasting 
eMedia Productions (DXAX-DTV) is broadcast on digital TV UHF 40 in both Zamboanga City and Basilan.

Aside on free TV in Zamboanga City and Basilan, eMedia can be seen through other means of media coverage:

Digital channels

UHF Channel 40 (629.143 MHz)

* - this is also broadcast in digital via GBPI TV 11.

Cable Television 
 Mindanao Cable Television - Channel 98
 Sky Cable - Channel 54

Radio programming 
 eMedia 105.9 News FM (DXWW-FM)

Programs 
Lists below are the major programs of eMedia Productions. eMedia also offers short-time air block for major events that is happening to Zamboanga such as local festivities, religious observance, and political matters.

Current 
 Levanta Zamboanga (Chavacano: Rise Zamboanga) - is the network's early morning news & talk program every Monday to Friday from 4:45 AM to 6 AM. Hosted by various news anchors of eMedia.
 Report Del Pueblo (Morning Edition) (Chavacano: Report of the Town) - is the network's morning news program every Monday to Friday from 6 AM to 7 AM. Hosted by Rey Bayona Bayoging, the president/CEO of the said company.
 eMedia Mo - (Chavacano: Your eMedia) - is the network's morning news & commentary & talk program every 7 AM to 8 AM. Hosted by Gil Climaco and Rey Bayona Bayoging.
 News Timeline - is the network's weekend morning news & talk analysis program every Saturday from 7 AM to 9 AM and replays on Sunday from the same time as well (7 to 9 AM). Hosted by Arvie del Rosario, April Pantaleon Araneta and Mar Alviar Saavedra.
 Barangay eMedia Action Center - is the network's afternoon public service program of eMedia every Monday to Friday from 3 PM to 4:30 PM. Hosted by Kap Fred Atilano.
 Report Del Pueblo (Afternoon Edition) (Chavacano: Report of the Town) - is the network's flagship & afternoon news program every Monday to Friday from 5 PM to 6 PM and replays on the same day at 8:30 PM to 9 PM. Hosted by Maria Sheila Apostol and Mark Alviar Saavedra.
 Ronda De Noche (Chavacano: Nightly Patrol) - is their nightly news programming as to get the latest updates every night in Zamboanga City every Monday to Friday from 7 PM to 8 PM.
 VezTV (Vale El Zamboanga) - VezTV as a short to VEZ: Vale El Zamboanga TV (Chavacano: How Great Zamboanga is) is a weekly travel magazine show hosted by Karen Grafia. The program started as a counterpart of ABS-CBN's Mag TV: De Aton Este with Karen Grafia as the pioneer host. Soon after, the staff and crew from Sky Cable Zamboanga along with Karen Grafia split up and formed their own magazine program as VezTV. They started programming on GBPI-TV 11 in 2013, then transferred to eMedia Productions in 2016.
 Life of Victory - a religious programming by the Victory Church Zamboanga with live streaming of their Sunday Service live from Grand Astoria Hotel.
 Mas Claro, Mas Decente, at your Service - is the network's Saturday talk & public service program every Saturday night. Hosted by Marlon Sebastian.
 City Hall Session - A 2-hour live broadcast of the city council session at the Sanggunian Panglungsod of Zamboanga City.

Former 
 Mission 2016: Boboto ako! - A special news coverage of eMedia Productions during the 2016 Philippine General Elections.
 Campus Headturners - The first Talent and Reality search on local television. Partnered by Mediabro Entertainment and hosted by Karen Grafia. The first season ended last October 30, 2016.
 eMedia Oke Mo - a variety show where eMedia invites everyone to visit at their studios in Divisoria, Zamboanga City and to sing along with eMedia hosts every 3:00 PM.
 On The Spot With Gil Climaco - A talk show hosted by Gil Climaco, inviting guests on his show and discussing issues that matters Zamboanga City.
 ESessions - A nightly music sessions featuring local performances of Zamboanga City performers.
 Asunto Legal - (Chavacano: Legal Matters) is a weekly legal affairs program hosted by the Western Mindanao State University - College of Law Dean, Atty. Eduardo Sanson.
 El Negosyo - (Chavacano: The Business) is a weekly programming that highlights businesses in Zamboanga City.
 Cosa Ba? Conversa! - (Chavacano: What? Just talk!) is their morning talk show hosted by JV Faustino and Liza Jocson.
 eAgri Ni Bay - (Visayan: This is eAgri, my friend) is a weekly agricultural programming that gives agricultural tips to farmers and highlights the agricultural business in Zamboanga City.
 Servicio Todo-Todo - (Chavacano: We provide service) a public service program of eMedia, partnered with the government agencies in Region 9.

Slogan 

 2013 to 2014 - Grabe Man! Dwele Sayo? 
 2015 - Serving local. Broadcasting Global.
 2016 - Hinde lang este radyo, TV este! eMedia Mo!
 2017* - Hinde lang este radyo, TV este! eMedia Mo! Solid!
 2021* - Mas pa na 100%, 105.9, eMedia Mo, FM SOLID!

*the word "solid" was added to their current slogan as their strong message for their loyal viewers.

See also
 Golden Broadcast Professionals, Inc.
 GBPI-TV 11 Zamboanga

References 

2013 establishments in the Philippines
Television networks in the Philippines
Television stations in Zamboanga City
Digital television stations in the Philippines
Philippine radio networks
Radio stations in Zamboanga City
Companies based in Zamboanga City